Corporate Air is an airline based in Billings, Montana, United States. It was established in 1981 and operates primarily domestic scheduled cargo services, Feeder service on behalf of FedEx Express, as well as the United States Postal Service. Its main base is Billings Logan International Airport.

Fleet 

The Corporate Air fleet included the following aircraft in October 2011:

4 Raytheon Beech 1900C Airliner
37 Cessna Caravan 675
2 Shorts 330-100

Previously operated
1 Dornier 228-212 (as of January 2005)
1 Raytheon Beech King Air 200
1 De Havilland Canada DHC-6 Twin Otter Series 300
5 Embraer EMB-120 Brasilia (As of June 2009)
4 Cessna 208 Caravan

FAA Fines 

October 13, 2010 Corporate Air was facing $455,000 in FAA fines for allowing a small airliner to carry passengers on 80 flights despite an engine that needed repair. The Federal Aviation Administration said Wednesday that the airline flew the Beech 1900C - a 19-passenger twin-engine turboprop plane - without repairing its right engine, which was consuming excessive amounts of oil. It was later determined that the engine was being operated in accordance with the engine manufacturers specifications for leaks and has been deemed legal.

The Billings, Mont., company has scheduled flights in nine states in addition to Montana: Colorado, Hawaii, Idaho, Minnesota, Nebraska, North Dakota, Utah, and Wyoming. It also operates six aircraft repair and maintenance facilities, according to a company website.

References

External links 
 

Cargo airlines of the United States
Airlines established in 1981
Airlines based in Montana
1981 establishments in the United States